New Mexico State Road 460 (NM 460) is a  paved, two-lane state highway in Doña Ana County, in the U.S. state of New Mexico.

The southern terminus of NM 460 is at the Texas state line in the town of Anthony where SH 20 ends.

Route description
The highway begins in the town of Anthony at the New Mexico - Texas state line where SH 20 highway ends. The road travels north-northeast for approximately  before turning mostly north. NM 460 passes by the Dos Lagos Golf Club and continues north through Anthony, and after  intersects NM 404. Continuing north, the highway enters the southern outskirts of the community of Berino, and reaches its northern terminus at intersection with FR 1035 west of the former I-10 exit 160.

History

According to available maps, the road occupied by the modern day NM 460 was originally constructed in the mid-1950s as the new alignment for US 80/US 85, east of the original path of the highway. I-10 was then built over the new alignment and extended south into Texas in late 1950s with exception of a short spur angling west towards Anthony. This spur was designated as NM 460 some time in early to mid 1960s. Originally, this road connected with I-10 at a trumpet interchange (known as exit 160) south of Berino. Some time around 2000 this interchange was eliminated, probably to allow construction of a large NM Truck Port of Entry roughly at this location. A new interchange at junction with NM 404 (exit 162) was constructed instead farther south.

Major intersections

See also

References

External links

460
Transportation in Doña Ana County, New Mexico
U.S. Route 85
U.S. Route 80
Interstate 10